Episcepsis melanota is a moth of the family Erebidae. It was described by George Hampson in 1909. It is found in Guyana.

References

Euchromiina
Moths described in 1909